The Cruizer class was an 18-gun class of brig-sloops of the Royal Navy. Brig-sloops were the same as ship-sloops except for their rigging. A ship-sloop was rigged with three masts whereas a brig-sloop was rigged as a brig with only a fore mast and a main mast.

The Cruizer class was the most numerous class of warships built by the British during the Napoleonic Wars, with 110 vessels ordered to this design (including two completed as ship sloops, and another 3 cancelled), and the second most numerous class of sailing warship built to a single design for any navy at any time, after the smaller 10-gun s.

Of the vessels in the class, eight (8%) were lost to the enemy, either destroyed or taken. Another was taken, but retaken. Fourteen (13%) were wrecked while in British service. Lastly, four (4%) foundered while in British service. In all cases of foundering and in many cases of wrecking all the crew was lost. Many of the vessels in the class were sold, some into mercantile service (of these, one at least was wrecked, but the fate of the others is generally unknown).

Design
In December 1796, the Navy Board placed new orders for four flush-decked sloops, to differing designs by the two Surveyors of the Navy — Sir William Rule and Sir John Henslow. In order to compare the qualities of ship-rigged and brig-rigged vessels, one vessel to each design was to be completed as a ship-sloop and the other as a brig-sloop. While the Henslow-designed vessels (the brig-sloop  and the ship-sloop ) would see no further sister ships built, the Rule-designed vessels (the brig-sloop Cruizer and the ship-sloop ) would each have a single sister ship ordered in the following March, and Rule's Cruizer design would subsequently see 106 constructed during the Napoleonic War. The hull design was exceeding fine (narrow as compared to length), with a noted deadrise amidships and a sharp sheer, giving away the design that had origins in the smaller cutter-type designs.

The order placed in March 1797 for the first sister ship to Cruizer was quickly amended to compete the ship (Osprey) as a ship sloop, but new orders for brig-sloops to the Cruizer design were placed from 1802 up to 1813. A final order in 1815 (HMS Samarang) was cancelled in 1820.

The Cruizer-class brig-sloops proved to be fast sailers and seaworthy, and the 32-pounder carronade armament gave them enormous short-range firepower, exceeding the nominal broadside of a standard 36-gun 18-pounder frigate. To a Royal Navy increasingly desperate for manpower, the great attraction of the design was that — thanks to the two-masted rig and the use of carronades with their small gun crews — this firepower could be delivered by a crew only a third the size of a frigate's. The Dutch built three 18 gun-brigs — Zwaluw, Mercuur and Kemphaan — to a similar design; in one case apparently a copy, though without the square tuck stern. The Russian brig Olymp was also built to the same lines.

The naval historian (and novelist) C.S. Forester commented in relation to the smaller gun-brigs (brig-rigged vessels of under 200 tons) that
The type was a necessary one but represented the inevitable unsatisfactory compromise when a vessel has to be designed to fight, to be seaworthy and to have a long endurance, all on a minimum displacement and at minimum expense. Few men in the Royal Navy had a good word to say for the gun-brigs, which rolled terribly and were greatly over-crowded, but they had to be employed.

Later in the same book he was more complimentary as regards the larger brigs such as the Cruizer class .

Perhaps the most salient aspect of his statement is that the Cruizer class and its smaller sister class, the Cherokee class, highlight the huge expansion of the Royal Navy. Whatever else one may say of the class, the Cruizer-class brig-sloops were both fast and provided serious firepower for minimal crewing, characteristics that appealed to a Navy suffering serious and ever increasing staffing shortages. The class proved to be ideal for many of the shallow water commitments in the Baltic and Ionian Seas, as well as around Danish waters.

Manning
Prior to 1808, the complement of officers, men, and boys for a Cruizer-class brig-sloop included 15 Royal Marines. After 1808, the vessels carried 20 marines comprising 1 sergeant, 1 corporal and 18 privates (the marine contingent on unrated vessels did not include a commissioned officer).

Service in the War of 1812

During the Anglo-American War of 1812, several ships of the class fell victim to larger American ship-rigged sloops of war of nominally the same class. The American vessels enjoyed an advantage in weight of broadside and number of crew. The ship-rigged sloops enjoyed the ability to back sail, and their rigging proved more resistant to damage; by contrast, a single hit to the brig-sloop's rig could render it unmanageable. In many cases, however, the American advantage was in the quality of their crews, as the American sloops generally had hand-picked volunteer crews, while the brigs belonging to the overstretched Royal Navy had to make do with crews filled out with landsmen picked up by the press gang. During a battle with the equivalently armed and crewed American brig , HMS Penguin was unable to land a single shot from her cannons, with the only American losses being inflicted by Royal Marines aboard the British ship.

The comparison was made in the London press unfavorably and was not entirely fair. The American ship-rigged sloops were bigger vessels, averaging just over 500 tons (bm); the Cruizer-class vessels were not quite 400 tons (bm). The crew sizes were disproportionate at 175 to 120, and at least some of the Cruizer class in these combats were outfitted with 24-pounder carronades vice the normal 32-pounders. The rigging was often the deciding factor as the combat between USS Peacock and HMS Epervier would highlight. When HMS Epervier lost her main topmast and had her foremast damaged she was disabled. USS Wasp, in another combat, would retain control despite the loss of her gaff, main topmast, and the mizzen topgallant. USS Wasp versus HMS Avon provided another example. Despite being fought gallantly, Avon was crippled by loss of a gaff. She then lost her main mast, which loss rendered her immobile. The  vessels, built in 1813–1814, were intended as an answer to the American ship-rigged sloops.

Vessels
The following table lists the Cruizer-class brig-sloops (and the two Snake-class ship-sloops, which were identical apart from carrying a three-masted ship rig) according to the date on which the Admiralty ordered them.

All subsequent vessels were brig-rigged on completion, although several were later converted to three-masted ship rig.

St Vincent's Board

The Board ordered 19 in 1802 and 1803.

Melville's First Board

The Board ordered six vessels to this design during May 1804, all of fir. Building of fir (pine) made for speedier construction at the cost of reduced durability in service.

Barham's Board

The Board ordered 22 vessels to this design, seventeen of which were launched in 1806 and five in 1807.

Grenville's Board
The Board ordered ten vessels to this design – all on 1 October 1806, nine of which were launched in 1807 and one in 1808.

Mulgrave's Board
This Board ordered 14 vessels to this design during 1807 and 1808.

Charles Yorke's Board

This Board ordered 15 of the design between January 1811 and January 1812.

Melville's Second Board

The Board ordered 20, of which only eighteen were built; two were cancelled.

See also
 Bibliography of early American naval history

Citations and references
Citations

References
 
 
 Clowes, William Laird, et al. (1897–1903) The royal navy : a history from the earliest times to the present. (London: S. Low, Marston and Co.) Vol. 6.

Further reading
 Petrejus, E W (1970). Modelling the brig-of-war Irene (A handbook for building a Cruizer-class model). De Esch. ASIN B0006C7NRA. [Irene was originally HMS Grasshopper. The Dutch renamed her Irene after they captured her.]

External links
 

 
Sloop classes